Warrener is a surname. Notable people with the surname include:

 Lowrie Warrener (1900–1983), Canadian painter
 Patrice Warrener (active 21st century), French light artist
 Rhett Warrener (born 1976), Canadian ice hockey player
 William T. Warrener (1861–1934), English painter

See also
 21671 Warrener, a minor planet